"Chica Virtual" is a 2007 single by reggaeton singer Arcángel, released in February 2007 by Universal Music Group. It was produced by executive producer DJ Nelson, and appears on the compilation album Flow la Discoteka 2, as well as Arcángel's second studio album El Fenómeno.

Chart performance
The song was a minor success on the U.S. Billboard Hot Latin Songs chart, peaking at #22.

Chart positions

References

2007 singles
Arcángel (singer) songs
Reggaeton songs
2007 songs
Universal Music Group singles